Apidae is the largest family within the superfamily Apoidea, containing at least 5700 species of bees. The family includes some of the most commonly seen bees, including bumblebees and honey bees, but also includes stingless bees (also used for honey production), carpenter bees, orchid bees, cuckoo bees, and a number of other less widely known groups. Many are valuable pollinators in natural habitats and for agricultural crops.

Taxonomy
In addition to its historical classification (honey bees, bumble bees, stingless bees and orchid bees), the family Apidae presently includes all the genera formerly placed in the families Anthophoridae and Ctenoplectridae.  Although the most visible members of Apidae are social, the vast majority of apid bees are solitary, including a number of cleptoparasitic species.

The old family Apidae contained four tribes (Apinae: Apini, Euglossini and Bombinae: Bombini, Meliponini) which have been reclassified as tribes of the subfamily Apinae, along with all of the former tribes and subfamilies of Anthophoridae and the former family Ctenoplectridae, which was demoted to tribe status. The trend to move groups down in taxonomic rank has been taken further by a 2005 Brazilian classification that places all existing bee families together under the name "Apidae", but it has not been widely accepted in the literature since that time.

Subfamilies

Apinae

The subfamily Apinae contains honey bees, bumblebees, stingless bees, orchid bees, and digger bees, among others. The bees of most tribes placed in Apinae are solitary with nests that are simple burrows in the soil. However, honey bees, stingless bees, and bumblebees are eusocial or colonial. These are sometimes believed to have each developed this trait independently, and show notable differences in such characteristics as communication between workers and methods of nest construction.

Tribes include:
Ancylaini
Anthophorini
Apini
Bombini
Centridini
Ctenoplectrini
Emphorini—(Subtribe Ancyloscelidina; Subtribe Emphorina)
Ericrocidini
Eucerini
Euglossini
Exomalopsini
Isepeolini
Melectini
Meliponini
Osirini
Protepeolini
Rhathymini
Tapinotaspidini
Tarsaliini
Tetrapediini
Teratognathini

Nomadinae

The subfamily Nomadinae, or cuckoo bees, has 31 genera in 10 tribes which are all cleptoparasites in the nests of other bees.

Tribes include:
Ammobatini
Ammobatoidini
Biastini
Brachynomadini
Caenoprosopidini
Epeolini—(Subtribe Epeolina; Subtribe Odyneropsina; Subtribe Thalestriina)
Hexepeolini
Neolarrini
Nomadini
Townsendiellini

Xylocopinae

The subfamily Xylocopinae, which includes carpenter bees, are mostly solitary, though they tend to be gregarious. Some tribe lineages, such as the Allodapini, contain eusocial species.

Most members of this subfamily make nests in plant stems or wood.

Tribes include:
Allodapini 
Ceratinini 
Manueliini
Xylocopini

See also
Bee (mythology)
List of crop plants pollinated by bees

References

External links

 BugGuide.Net: Family Apidae—Cuckoo, Carpenter, Digger, Bumble, and Honey Bees; and other bees .
 BugGuide.net: Native Bees of North America

 
Bee families